The 2013–14 South Dakota Coyotes men's basketball team represented the University of South Dakota during the 2013–14 NCAA Division I men's basketball season. The Coyotes, led by first year interim head coach and former assistant Joey James, played their home games at the DakotaDome and were members of The Summit League. They finished the season 12–18, 6–8 in The Summit League play to finish in fifth place. They lost in the quarterfinals of The Summit League tournament to Denver.

Interim head coach Joey James was not retained at the end of the season.

Roster

Schedule

|-
!colspan=9 style="background:#E34234; color:#FFFFFF;"| Regular season

|-
!colspan=9 style="background:#E34234; color:#FFFFFF;"| 2014 The Summit League tournament

References

South Dakota Coyotes men's basketball seasons
South Dakota
Coyo
Coyo